This is a list of individuals of Lebanese ancestry who are born, grew up and/or live in Germany. The list does not include Libo-Palestinians (—> List of German people of Palestinian descent)

Athletes
Combat sport
 , multiple World Champion in kickboxing
 , former multiple German Champion in karate
 Manuel Charr - current WBA heavyweight World Champion in boxing
 Rola El-Halabi - former multiple World Champion in women’s boxing
 , kickboxer 
 Zeina Nassar - current German Champion in women’s boxing 
 Khalid Taha - mixed martial artist competing in the UFC

Football
 Mohammad Baghdadi
 Omar Bugiel
 
 Karim Darwich
 Hilal El-Helwe 
 Issa Issa
 Bilal Kamarieh
 Reda Khadra - German Under-18 National Team player
 Khaled Mohssen
 Hassan Oumari
 Joan Oumari 
 Bilal Aziz Özer
 Mahmout Najdi 
 Munier Raychouni
 Feiz Shamsin
 Amin Younes - German National Team player
 Daniel Zeaiter

Rest
 Benjamin Hassan - Tennis player

Models
 Amina Sabbah - beauty queen and model

Musicians
Rapper
  
 Tony D [de]
  
  
 Jamule 
  
 MoTrip 
 Baba Saad
 Samra 
 Zuna

Rapper and singer

 
 

Singer 
  - pop and R&B singer, entrepreneur and manager of Kollegah
  - jazz musician
 Fady Maalouf - DSDS Finalist 2008
 Rola - R&B and pop singer
 Tarééc - R&B singer

Actors
 Hassan Akkouch
  
 
  
 Margit Saad

Directors
  - TV films & documentations

Politicians
 Ahmad Omeirat

Scientists
 Hassan Naim - biochemist
 Ahmad A. Omeirate - Economist and Islam Scientist
 Bilal Ibrahim : OPHTHALMOLOGIST: Founder of Alpha Augenzentrum, He has received many awards for his contributions in his field

Publicist

Television
 Aline Abboud - journalist and TV presenter

Miscellaneous
 Khalid El-Masri - detainee wrongfully held by the U.S.
 Ahmad Miri - famous clan member
 Mahmoud Al-Zein - crime boss

See also
Lebanese people in Germany
List of Lebanese people
List of Lebanese people (Diaspora)

References

Germany
Lebanese

Lebanese